Andrew Martin (born 4 December 1961) is a former cyclist from Guam. He competed in the team pursuit at the 1992 Summer Olympics.

References

External links
 

1961 births
Living people
Guamanian male cyclists
Olympic cyclists of Guam
Cyclists at the 1992 Summer Olympics
American track cyclists
Place of birth missing (living people)